The Breathtaking Blue is the third album by German synth-pop band Alphaville, released in April 1989. A companion video, Songlines, was released in September 1989. The CD release of this album was one of the first commercial CD+G format discs. Alphaville released three singles from the album, "Romeos", "Summer Rain" and "Mysteries of Love", the first of which charted internationally.

A remastered and re-released version of the album, on both CD and vinyl, was released on 7 May 2021.

Album production
Production of the album was difficult, singer Marian Gold would later say "the production saw Alphaville in the horrors of permanent crisis. There was an ongoing war between [the band]. ... The furious guitar shrieks during the intro [of lead-off single "Romeos"] being a true indication of the real spirit of the production," and that "'The Breathtaking Blue' was our 'I don't give a shit' album, a self-indulgent arrogant blind shot over the shoulder into the future with our backs to the audience."

The album was re-released on 7 May 2021, and included remastered b-sides, demos, and a DVD with the original CD+G graphics package as well as the video collection Songlines, which had not been available since its original release in 1989. The release was overseen by original band members Gold and Bernhard Lloyd, and was remastered by Lloyd and Stefan Betke.

Album cover
The cover of the album is a composite of two works: the first being The Tower of Babel by Pieter Bruegel; the second being the blue sun. The face in the blue sun is credited to Michelangelo, from a sibyl on the ceiling of the Sistine Chapel. The halo of sunrays is of unknown origin. The year '1989' (the year the album was released) is displayed in Roman numerals across the bottom of the cover. The back cover has a drawing of Pharaoh Akhenaten and Queen Nefertiti.

Reception

Evan Cater, writing for AllMusic, called the album "somewhat disappointing" compared to their previous releases, and notes that "the production, by Klaus Schulze and Alphaville ... is met with mixed success." In particular the reviewer found that the songs suffered due to the band's "experiments with a somewhat richer instrumentation, adding strings, saxophone, trumpet, double bass, electric and even acoustic guitars." Cater did like some of the individual tracks on the album, calling "Heaven or Hell" "one of the album's more interesting efforts", and "For a Million" "as genuine as the band gets." Graeme Kay, writing for Q Magazine, was more positive, calling the album "a highly polished cluster of glimmering technopop" and saying that "the overall effect is accessible and often breathtaking."

Track listing

Original 1989 release

Many of the album's tracks would find their way, in remixed, instrumental or demo form, to 1999's album Dreamscapes.

2021 Remaster

Personnel
Guitars: Blacky Schwarz Ruszczynski, Micael Ryan, Eff Jott Krueger, Manuel Goettsching
Backing vocals: Miriam Stockley, Mae McKenna, Patti Calore, The Lunapark Office Choir, Gabi Becker
String arrangement: Rainer Bloss, Klaus Schulze
Crescendo guitar: Kenneth Ward
Saxophones: Thomas Keller, Friedemann Graef
Drums, additional percussion: Hansi Behrendt
Double bass: Ernst Deuker
Vocoder voices: Julie Ocean
Trumpet: Michael Junker
String and brass arrangement: Rainer Bloss

Musicians Hansi Behrendt, Eff Jott Krueger and Ernst Deuker, who helped with some of the songs on this album, were themselves from the German band Ideal. Gabi Becker recorded with Alphaville again on 2003's CrazyShow.

Charts

References

1989 albums
Alphaville (band) albums